Norman (Norm) Reynolds (born 26 March 1934) is a British production designer and film director, best known for his work on the original Star Wars trilogy and Raiders of the Lost Ark. He was born in Willesden, London.

He directed two episodes of the Emmy Award winning Amazing Stories TV series, "The Pumpkin Competition" and "Gather Ye Acorns". He was a second unit director for Alive and The Exorcist III.

Awards

Won
1978 Academy Award for Best Production Design - Star Wars Episode IV: A New Hope (shared with John Barry, Leslie Dilley, and Roger Christian)
1982 BAFTA Award for Best Production Design - Raiders of the Lost Ark (shared with Leslie Dilley and Michael D. Ford)
1982 Academy Award for Best Production Design - Raiders of the Lost Ark (shared with Leslie Dilley and Michael D. Ford)

Nominated
1977 Academy Award for Best Production Design - The Incredible Sarah (shared with Elliot Scott)
1981 Academy Award for Best Production Design - The Empire Strikes Back (shared with Leslie Dilley, Harry Lange, Alan Tomkins and Michael D. Ford)
1984 Academy Award for Best Production Design - Return of the Jedi (shared with Fred Hole, James L. Schoppe, Michael D. Ford)
1988 Academy Award for Best Production Design - Empire of the Sun (shared with Harry Cordwell)
1988 BAFTA Award for Best Production Design - Empire of the Sun (shared with Harry Cordwell)

Selected filmography

As art director
Superman II: The Richard Donner Cut (2006)
Superman II (1980)
Superman (1978)
Star Wars Episode IV: A New Hope (1977)
The Incredible Sarah (1976)
Lucky Lady (1975)
The Old Curiosity Shop (1975)
The Little Prince (1974)

As production designer
Bicentennial Man (1999)
Sphere (1998)
Mission: Impossible (1996)
Clean Slate (1994)
Alive  (1993)
Alien 3 (1992)
Avalon (1990)
Mountains of the Moon (1990)
Empire of the Sun (1987)
Young Sherlock Holmes (1985)
Return to Oz (1985)
Return of the Jedi (1983)
Raiders of the Lost Ark (1981)
The Empire Strikes Back (1980)

References

External links

1934 births
Living people
Artists from London
Best Art Direction Academy Award winners
Best Production Design BAFTA Award winners
British film designers
Businesspeople from London